HMS Delphinium (K77) was a Flower-class corvette built for the Royal Navy (RN) from 1940-1946.  From 1941 to  1943 she was active in the Mediterranean as an escort to convoys supporting the  Eighth Army and the  invasion of Sicily. From mid-1943 onwards she was on convoy escort duties between Africa, the Mediterranean and the United Kingdom; and Atlantic convoys between North America and the United Kingdom. She escorted a total of  68 convoys.

Design and construction 
Displacement was about  standard and  full load.

Design armament was a single BL 4-inch Mk IX naval gun forward and a single 2-pounder "pom-pom" anti-aircraft cannon aft, although the pom-poms were not available until 1941, so early Flowers such as Delphinium were completed with improvised close-range anti aircraft armament such as Lewis guns or Vickers .50 machine guns instead.

Delphinium was one of the first group of Flower-class corvettes modified for magnetic minesweeping In February 1941, they were also fitted with SA Type A Mark II gear (a submersible A-frame and bucket) to detonate acoustic mines. Delphinium retained anti-submarine capacity, although there was a reduction in the number of depth charges carried.

Delphinium formed part of the initial 26-ship order for Flower-class corvettes placed on 25 July 1939 under the 1939/40 Naval estimates. She was laid down at Henry Robb's, Leith shipyard on 31 October 1939, was launched on 6 June 1940 and commissioned on 15 November 1940.

Service history 
In February 1942, Delphinium was adopted by Torrington and District, Devon, as part of a warship week National Savings Campaign. Between 1941 and 1945, Delphinium escorted a total of 68 convoys.

After commissioning, Delphinium escorted four Atlantic Convoys in January 1941. In February 1941 she joined convoy OG-53 as an escort during passage to Gibraltar. In December 1941, Delphinium was part of the 11th corvette group based in Alexandria.

Between March and June 1942, she escorted 11 convoys between Tobruk and Alexandria supplying the Eighth Army in North Africa.

In January 1942 (escorting convoy AT-16), Delphinium (along with ) ran aground in Great Pass Alexandria. She was refloated with minor damage. On 20 May 1942, the German Submarine U-431 spotted convoy AT-46 about 65 miles east of Tobruk and torpedoed Eocene. Delphinium and the other convoy escorts  ( and HMS Falk) dropped depth charges over the suspected position of the U-431, however it remained undetected and managed to escape.

In  June 1942, Delphinium took part in Operation Vigorous, escorting supply convoy MW11 from the eastern Mediterranean to supply Malta.

Between June 1942 and July 1943, Delphinium did not escort any major convoys   and in September 1942, was organised as the lead of the 3rd Escort Group assigned to vessels sailing between Port Said and Alexandria.

On 11 February 1943, the Dutch Tanker, Saroena was torpedoed by German submarine U-81, and caught fire. Saroena was run aground in the  St. George Bay, near Beirut and Delphinium assisted in the salvage operation.

In July 1943, Delphinium returned to convoy escort duty as part of the Allied invasion of Sicily (convoy KMS 019a), escorting a convoy of tankers sent to re-supply the invasion fleet.

From August 1943 to May 1945, Delphinium escorted 14 convoys sailing between the Port Said and Chesapeake Bay (GUS/UGS), 20 Atlantic convoys between the Mediterranean and Liverpool (MKS/KMS), and a further 15  convoys variously between United Kingdom and Sierra Leone (OS) as well as within the United Kingdom (TBC/BTC).

Fate 
Delphinium was scrapped at Pembroke Dock in February 1949.

References

External links 

 Convoy lists HMS Delphinium

Flower-class corvettes of the Royal Navy
Ships built in Leith
1940 ships